Bay Port is an unincorporated community and census-designated place (CDP) in Huron County in the U.S. state of Michigan.  The population was 477 at the 2010 census.  As an unincorporated community, Bay Port has no legal autonomy of its own but does have its own post office with the 48720 ZIP Code.

History
Bay Port was settled in 1851 by Carl H. Heisterman. It was first named "Geneva" and later "Wild Fowl Port". The post office was relocated here from Ora Labora in 1872.

The Bay Port Historic Commercial Fishing District is a located within the community and is listed on the National Register of Historic Places.

Geography

Bay Port is a community on the shores of Saginaw Bay within Lake Huron.  The majority of the CDP is located within Fairhaven Township with only a very small portion within McKinley Township.  The U.S. Census Bureau lists  and 475 residents within Fairhaven Township, while only  and two residents are within McKinley Township.

Major highways
 runs along the Lake Huron coastline through the community.
, known locally as Pigeon Road begins in the community and runs east to the opposite side of the county.

Events
Each year, during the first full weekend of August, Bay Port hosts its annual Fish Sandwich Festival. Bay Port's unofficial motto is "Where the fish caught the man", due to its easy lake access for sport fishermen.

Demographics

Bay Port, Michigan has a reported population of 582 in 2020. The population is primarily white as it is reported that 96.22% of the population identifies as such. The next biggest racial group is Asian with 2.29%. Followed by Native Americans which make up less than one percent of the population.

Notable people
Sanford A. Brown (1909–1986), Michigan State Treasurer

References

Unincorporated communities in Huron County, Michigan
Unincorporated communities in Michigan
Census-designated places in Huron County, Michigan
Census-designated places in Michigan
Populated places established in 1851
1851 establishments in Michigan
Populated places on Lake Huron in the United States